Park Jae-sang (born December 31, 1977), known professionally as Psy (stylized in all caps as PSY), is a South Korean singer, rapper, songwriter, and record producer. Psy is known domestically for his humorous videos and stage performances, and internationally for his hit single "Gangnam Style". The song's refrain was entered into The Yale Book of Quotations as one of the most famous quotations of 2012.

On December 21, 2012, his music video for "Gangnam Style" exceeded one billion views on YouTube, becoming the first video to do so in the website's history. Psy was subsequently recognized by the media as the King of YouTube. As of March 2022, it is the eleventh most viewed video on YouTube, with over 4 billion views.

In December 2012, MTV noted Psy's rise from being little known outside South Korea, to being hailed as the "Viral Star of 2012". On December 31, 2012, Psy performed in a globally televised New Year's Eve celebration with American rapper MC Hammer on-stage in front of a live audience of over a million people in Times Square, New York City. Following his departure from YG Entertainment in 2018, he founded his own company, P Nation, in 2019.

Early life

Park Jae-sang was born on December 31, 1977, to an affluent family in the Gangnam District of Seoul, South Korea. His father, Park Won-Ho, is the executive chairman of DI Corporation, a manufacturer of semiconductor manufacturing equipment listed on the Korea Exchange. His mother, Kim Young-hee, owns several restaurants in Gangnam.

Park attended Banpo (반포) Elementary and Middle Schools and Sehwa (세화) High School. He disliked school and was known as the class clown. In an interview on South Korea's Seoul Broadcasting System, a former teacher of Park said: "I remember Psy making a lot of sexual jokes during class. He had such a big influence that he would drive the entire class to his jokes. I disliked him at the time, but looking back, I see that he added a great energy to the class."

Park told CNN's Alina Cho that when he was 15 years old, he watched a Korean TV programme that introduced foreign pop music. One particular episode showed a concert at Wembley Stadium held by the British rock band Queen where they performed their 1975 hit single "Bohemian Rhapsody". Park said it was this concert footage that sparked his love for music.

Music career

1996–2000: Brief study in the United States and career beginnings

As part of preparations to take over DI Corporation from his father, Park had originally planned to study business administration at Boston University in 1996. However, upon his arrival in the United States, he lost interest in his studies, spending his remaining tuition funds on musical instruments and entertainment equipment, including a computer, an electric keyboard, and a MIDI interface. After attending an English-language summer course and studying for one semester, Park dropped out of Boston University and applied to study at Berklee College of Music instead. During his time at Berklee, Park took core curriculum lessons in ear training, contemporary writing and music synthesis, but he soon dropped out and returned to South Korea to pursue a career as a singer, without having attained a degree from either Boston University or Berklee.
Psy was found by South Korean rapper zoPD and featured in the song "카사노바" from his second album In Stardom Version 2.0 in 1999.
In South Korea, Psy made his first appearance on Korean national television in 2000 after his dancing caught the eye of a TV producer.

2001–2002: Psy from the Psycho World!, controversy, and domestic success
In January 2001, Psy debuted his full-length album Psy from the Psycho World!, for which he was fined by South Korean government authorities due to his album's "inappropriate content". Psy was a rookie hip hop singer that stirred up the Korean pop music scene with very blunt lyrics, peculiar dance moves and an unconventional appearance that earned him the nickname "The Bizarre Singer(엽기가수)".

His second album Sa 2 also created controversy upon its release in 2002, earning complaints from civil groups due to the potentially negative influence his album would have on children and teenagers. Since then, Psy has been thought of as a controversial artist, and Sa 2 was banned in 2002 from being sold to the under-19 set. In September of the same year, Psy released his third album 3 Psy. The album's title song, "Champion", saw great success partly due to the hype from the World Cup games held in Seoul. Despite the significant amount of controversy surrounding his music, Psy was awarded songwriting accolades at the annual Seoul Music Awards, marking his breakthrough in the South Korean music industry.

2003–2009: Military service, Ssajib, and re-enlistment
In 2003, Psy was conscripted into the South Korean military as part of mandatory military service imposed on all South Korean men aged 18 to 35. Psy was excused from military duty due to working at a software development company (the South Korean government grants exemptions to those with technical expertise work in companies that serve the national interest). He was expected to be released from duties in 2005. In 2006, Psy released his fourth album Ssajib, which won honors at the 2006 SBS Music Awards and Hong Kong's Mnet Asian Music Awards.

In 2007, state prosecutors accused Psy of "neglecting" his work, holding concerts and appearing on local television networks during his period of prior employment. On October 12, 2007, the Seoul Administrative Court decided that Psy must be redrafted, rejecting a lawsuit filed by Psy against the Military Manpower Administration (MMA) in August. Two months later, Psy was re-drafted into the military where he had held the rank of Private First Class and served as a signalman in the 52nd Army Infantry Division, before being released from duties in July 2009.

2010–2012: Fifth studio album and debut performance in Japan
Owing to financial difficulties, Psy could no longer release his own songs. His wife encouraged him to join the South Korean music label YG Entertainment, whose founder and chief executive officer Yang Hyun-suk was an old friend of Psy's. In 2010, Psy joined YG Entertainment. The K-pop singer Kim Hee-chul, from the boyband Super Junior, wished Psy had joined his group's label SM Entertainment instead. Psy released his fifth album PsyFive in 2010, and its lead single "Right Now" was banned from under-19 audiences by South Korea's Ministry of Gender Equality and Family for what it deemed an "obscene" lyric, "Life is like toxic alcohol". Despite the ban, Psy received awards during the 2011 Melon Music Awards and Mnet Asian Music Awards. Psy had, up until this point, topped domestic music charts half a dozen times throughout his twelve-year career in South Korea.

On January 7, 2012, Psy performed alongside K-pop bands Bigbang and 2NE1 in front of 80,000 Japanese fans during the YG Family Concert in Osaka. His performance was broadcast by Mezamashi TV (mezamashi meaning "wake-up alarm"), a Japanese news magazine show produced by Fuji Television. This marked his first appearance on a foreign broadcasting network. During the concert, Psy introduced himself to his Japanese fans with a sign that read "I'm a famous singer well known for driving the audience wild in Korea, but here, today, I'm just a little chubby newcomer" and sang five of his hit songs while Japanese TV commentators expressed their approval in their astonishment at his humorous incorporation of the moves of Lady Gaga and Beyoncé.

2012–2013: "Gangnam Style" and international breakthrough

In July 2012, Psy released his sixth album Psy 6 (Six Rules), Part 1 and the song "Gangnam Style" appeared in broadcasting networks and newspapers outside Asia. On August 14, "Gangnam Style" ranked first on YouTube's 'Most Viewed Videos' monthly chart; on August 21, 2012, "Gangnam Style" officially charted No. 1 on the iTunes Music Video Charts, overtaking Justin Bieber's "As Long as You Love Me" and Katy Perry's "Wide Awake"; this feat was the first for a South Korean artist. After the video went viral, celebrities quickly jumped on board, with Katy Perry, Britney Spears, and Tom Cruise taking to Twitter to share their delight. The Gangnam Style phenomenon has also popularized his older music videos, such as "Right Now". On September 14, 2012, he appeared on The Today Show on NBC in New York City, performing the song live and teaching dance moves to the anchors. The following day, he also made a cameo appearance on Saturday Night Live during a skit featuring "Gangnam Style". Commenting on his popularity among foreign celebrities, Psy said:

Riding high on the success of "Gangnam Style", Psy was signed by Scooter Braun to Braun's Schoolboy Records, a label distributed by Republic Records. In early September, the Gangnam district awarded Psy with a plaque and named him an honorary ambassador. On October 24, 2012, Psy was recognized by the United Nations as an "International sensation". According to Reuters, U.N. Secretary General Ban Ki-moon scheduled a meeting with Psy in the belief that music has great power to overcome intolerance. On October 23, 2012, they met at the United Nations Headquarters where Ban expressed his desire to work with Psy. He remarked that Psy has an "unlimited global reach" and said, "I hope that we can work together using your global reach".

According to Korean newspaper The Dong-a Ilbo, Psy was appointed as a goodwill ambassador of the United Nations Children's Fund (UNICEF).

On November 7, 2012, Psy held a speech in England at the Oxford Union to discuss the inspiration behind "Gangnam Style" and his next album. He told the audience that due to the success of "Gangnam Style" he is now living in both a dream and a nightmare, as it will be difficult for his next song to equal "Gangnam Style"'s success. He also talked about his early life and the moment he realized "Gangnam Style" became famous. According to The Independent, tickets for his speech were "in such demand they had to be assigned by ballot—a method not required when former presidential candidate John McCain spoke earlier that year, nor when Mother Teresa, the Dalai Lama nor Michael Jackson spoke".

On November 12, 2012, Psy became the second South Korean music artist to appear at the MTV Europe Music Awards where he performed "Gangnam Style" and held off competition from Rihanna, Katy Perry, and Lady Gaga to win the "Best Video" award. The event was broadcast worldwide and hosted by the German model and actress Heidi Klum, who introduced Psy to the audience as the "undisputed King of Pop". A few days later, American singer-songwriter Madonna performed a mashup of "Gangnam Style" and "Give It 2 Me" alongside Psy and her backup dancers during a concert in New York City at Madison Square Garden during The MDNA Tour. Psy later told reporters that his gig with Madonna had "topped his list of accomplishments".

On November 24, 2012, "Gangnam Style" became the most viewed video in YouTube history, surpassing the previous most-watched video, Justin Bieber's "Baby". The number of views was achieved about eleven times faster than Bieber's. Psy later won four awards at the 2012 Mnet Asian Music Awards in Hong Kong on November 30, 2012. On December 21, 2012, "Gangnam Style" reached 1 billion views on YouTube, becoming the first video to do so in the website's history. He met actor and stunt performer Jackie Chan, who called him a role model that proved that "dreams do come true". Also, he was selected as Singer of the Year in the public survey conducted by Gallup Korea that year.

In January 2013, Psy was announced as a winner of the 2013 Korea Image Awards, being awarded the Korea Image Stepping Stone Award for "his contribution to enhancing the national image". Psy made his debut on South American television by giving an interview on the Brazilian news program Fantástico. It was announced on January 27, 2013, that Psy would perform at South Korea's presidential inauguration ceremony on February 25, 2013.

2013–2014: "Gentleman", "Hangover", YouTube record
On April 12, 2013, the audio of Psy's follow-up single "Gentleman" was leaked onto the internet, a day before its official international release. On the following day, the music video for 'Gentleman' premiered at Psy's 'Happening' Concert, which was attended by 50,000 people and live streamed on YouTube to an audience of 150,000. Guest performers of the concert included Lee Hi, 2NE1 and G-Dragon. He reportedly invested US$2.7 million into the production of the concert. Psy continued to promote Gentlemen throughout 2013. In May 2013, PSY appeared twice on Live! with Kelly and Michael and taught Kelly Ripa and Michael Strahan how to do the Gentleman Dance. Psy also appeared in the finale of American Idol season 12 and sang "Gentleman". Psy also performed his song "Gentleman" on the Finale of Dancing With the Stars, Season 16. Five days later, Psy also performed at the final match of the 2012–13 Coppa Italia. On June 8, 2013, Psy and his troupe performed "Gentleman" on the Finale of Britain's Got Talent, Series 7. Later that month, on June 8, Psy co-hosted the Canadian MuchMusic Video Awards, where he also opened the show with his worldwide hit "Gangnam Style" and ended the show with his "official last performance of 'Gentleman' on TV."

Psy was slated to star in a South Korean remake of the Hindi film ABCD: Any Body Can Dance, taking over the role of Vishnu (Prabhu Deva) in the original film. In April he became the tourism ambassador of South Korea for 2013. On May 9, Psy gave a special lecture at Harvard University. In this lecture, he spoke about his passion and other reasons for his popularity. On May 24, 2013, people began voting daily, at www.psygobibigo.com, for one of the Top Three Chefs, based on more than one hundred ninety video entries, in Psy's "Psy Needs a Chef" video contest. The Top Three Chefs in this contest were Aaron Contreras, Dj Park and Ricardo Caput. Voting ended June 10, 2013, at midnight Greenwich Mean Time. Aaron Contreras received 2,005 votes. Ricardo received 22,384 votes. Dj Park, won the popular vote with 22,533 votes. Winners were to be announced June 14, 2013. However, Psy postponed his decision until June 18, 2013, and chose Ricardo to be his chef, in spite of the popular vote.

On June 9, 2014, Psy released a new single, "Hangover", featuring American rapper Snoop Dogg, and announced his intention to release a new song titled "Father".

On December 1, 2014, the YouTube video for "Gangnam Style" garnered over 231 − 1 views, overflowing the YouTube counter to a negative number, resulting in a public comment from Google/YouTube saying "We never thought a video would be watched in numbers greater than a 32-bit integer (=2,147,483,647 views), but that was before we met PSY. "Gangnam Style" has been viewed so many times we had to upgrade to a 64-bit integer (9,223,372,036,854,775,808)!" Hovering over the counter of the YouTube video triggered an easter egg. A YouTube representative later revealed that the comment was a joke and that the company had already updated to a 64-bit integer months ago.

2015–2018: Chiljip PSY-da, 4X2=8, and departure from YG Entertainment
On March 28, 2015, he released a music video for his song Father. On December 1, 2015, Psy released his seventh album titled Chiljip PSY-da, with double title tracks "Daddy" and "Napal Baji". The album included features from label mate CL as well as Will.i.am Promotions for the album included two performances on Inkigayo, where the single "Daddy" won a triple crown, as well as a performance on You Hee-yeol's Sketchbook. "Daddy" was also included in the dance video game Just Dance 2017.

In May 2017, Psy released his eighth studio album, 4X2=8, with lead singles "I Luv it" and "New Face". The album features collaborations from several artists including label-mates G-Dragon and Taeyang. The music video for "I Luv It" featured actor Lee Byung-hun and comedian Pikotaro while for the "New Face" video Apink's Son Na-eun played the title role.

On May 15, 2018, Psy officially left YG Entertainment after eight years.

2019–present: P Nation, Loud, and Psy 9th 
In 2019, he founded his own label P Nation. He signed his first artist Jessi on January 25, 2019. Two days later, on January 27, 2019, he also signed both Hyuna and Dawn, formerly of Cube Entertainment with the latter being a former member of Pentagon under the name E'Dawn. He also signed Crush on July 17, 2019, and Heize on September 16, 2020. On April 26, 2021, it was reported that he and Park Jin-young, the founder of JYP Entertainment, will collaborate together to form a new boy group each in Loud, which premiered on June 5, 2021 on SBS. In 2022, Psy did his first concert in Dubai as part of the Expo 2020 on Korean national day event.

On April 29, 2022, Psy released his ninth studio album, Psy 9th, with its lead single "That That" featuring Suga of BTS.

On June 10, 2022, Psy released the official SNS afternoon tour schedule of 'Psy Soak Show SUMMER SWAG 2022', a domestic tour of 7 cities in the country until August 20.

P Nation 
Following Psy's departure from YG Entertainment in 2018, Psy founded his own entertainment company, P Nation. Psy announced the first artist signed to his label in January 2019, the rapper Jessi. P Nation then signed Hyuna and Dawn, both formerly of Cube Entertainment.

As of November 2022, the label had 10 artists signed to the label, including the six-member boy band, TNX. The record label is located in the Gangnam area.

Artistry
Park Jae-sang's stage name "Psy" derives from the word psycho. Explaining his stage name, he said in a BBC interview, "what I thought was, you know, crazy about music, dancing, performance, so that kind of psycho".

Influences
In a 2012 interview with The New York Times, Psy called Freddie Mercury of the British rock band Queen his biggest musical influence: "My lifetime role model and hero is Freddie Mercury of Queen. His songwriting skills, I cannot even approach, but his showmanship, I learned it from videos. I'm No. 1 in the U.K. right now, so if I have any chance to go there, I want to meet Queen and to tell them how much I got inspired by their music." Psy also revealed that the one celebrity he wants to meet most is the American actor Tom Cruise, who helped popularize "Gangnam style" on Twitter and tweeted whether Psy would "make a good future co-star Gangnam Style?".

Public image

Psy is known for his sense of humor in his concerts, where he imitates female singers such as Park Ji-yoon, Lee Hyo-ri, Lady Gaga, and Beyoncé.
Although his music is part of the K-pop (Korean popular music) genre, Beth Hong from The Vancouver Observer noted that Psy doesn't fit the standard K-pop idol image of being "incredibly young, good-looking, and able to carry a melodramatic note".

Lucy Williamson from the BBC recognized Psy as South Korea's "newest and biggest music star", but also described him as "unpolished, unpredictable and he doesn't look like your typical Korean idol". Sarah Charlton from Reuters called him a "chubby South Korean pop singer" that has found fame and popularity in a "sea of pretty K-pop stars". In South Korea, some have called him the "Bizarre Singer" while others consider him to be "the antithesis of what is popular in Korean pop music".

Chelsea Handler from Chelsea Lately jokingly described Psy as "Korea's Ricky Martin, as well as a sex symbol" during his introduction on the show, while Gil Kaufman from MTV described the singer as one of the "biggest pop sensations in the world".

Legacy
During the span of his career, Psy was awarded multiple Guinness World Records for:

"Gangnam Style" – Most viewed video online
"Gangnam Style" – Most "liked" video online
"Gangnam Style" – First video to be viewed more than 1 billion times on YouTube
 "Gentleman" – Most viewed video online in 24 hours
"Gangnam Style" – First video to be viewed more than 2 billion times on YouTube

As a result of his achievements, Psy is considered to be the first K-pop artist to make a breakthrough in the Western music industry. In an interview with Agence France-Presse, Psy affirmed that "[i]t will be only a matter of time before K-Pop will produce many others like Psy".

According to Hugo Swire, the British Minister of State for the Foreign Office, Psy's music has given the world a glimpse of the dynamism and vibrancy of modern Korea. South Korea's Ministry of Culture, Sports and Tourism recognized Psy's cultural achievements by bestowing upon him the Okgwan Order, a 4th grade Order of Cultural Merit.

On May 25, 2017, Psy was presented with a Diamond Play Button from YouTube, in recognition of his surpassing 10 million subscribers to his YouTube channel, making him the first Asian solo artist to ever do so.

Personal life
On October 14, 2006, Psy married Yoo Hye-yeon, a cello major at Yonsei University and his girlfriend of three and a half years. According to the Korean Broadcasting System, the couple were introduced by a mutual acquaintance. They have twin daughters. Psy considers "Gangnam Style" to be the greatest achievement of his life. Psy finalized the purchase of a condominium unit in Westwood, Los Angeles, California, in November 2012. Psy made the purchase to relocate to Los Angeles following his signing with US-based music manager Scooter Braun to further his career.

In a July 2013 interview with The Sunday Times, Psy stated that he has a drinking problem, noting that the only time he is not drinking alcohol is when he is hung over.

In 2022, he moved back to South Korea to start a record label, located in Gangnam. He lives north of the river.

Legal issues
In late 2001, Psy was arrested for smoking and possessing marijuana and was sentenced to 25 days in jail. As a result, he was unable to be at his grandfather's deathbed as he died of cancer, or attend his funeral. During an interview in 2012 Psy stated "I was very close to him. I was not there at the funeral: I will regret this for the rest of my life, because my grandpa loved me so much, and I couldn't be there for him on his deathbed." Psy was also fined in January 2002 for the marijuana incident.

Views on North Korea
In the early 2010s, South Korea's Sunshine Policy towards North Korea was downscaled as tensions between the two countries continued to increase. As a result, Psy was questioned by the media on several occasions regarding his views on North Korea.

On April 13, 2013, Psy attended a press conference where he expressed regret about his country's conflict with North Korea and described the situation as a "tragedy". He also expressed hope that North Koreans would one day be able to enjoy his music before elaborating that his job is to make everyone, including North Koreans, laugh. Right before the start of a concert in Seoul, Psy added: "Tonight me and 50,000 Korean people... we are going to sing out loud. We are going to shout out loud and we are really close to them, so they [the North Koreans] can hear."

In an interview with The Daily Beast in April 2013, Psy was asked to give his take on North Korean leader Kim Jong-un's threats against South Korea and the United States, to which he replied: "Well, as an entertainer, I don't want to talk about politics. As a Korean citizen, I want peace. That's all I can say. I want permanent peace."

Philanthropy 
On August 11, 2022, Psy donated  to help those affected by the 2022 South Korean floods through the Hope Bridge Korea Disaster Relief Association.

Controversies

Anti-American performances and subsequent apology

In 2002, Psy participated in an anti-American concert after a U.S. military convoy accidentally struck and killed two 14-year-old South Korean schoolgirls in the Yangju highway incident. The soldiers involved in the incident were acquitted by U.S. military courts, which fueled a significant amount of anti-American sentiment in South Korea. Inspired by that incident, Psy lifted up a miniature model of an 'American tank' and smashed it against the stage.

In 2004, the South Korean translator and Christian missionary Kim Sun-il was kidnapped and beheaded in Iraq after the South Korean government refused to reconsider sending its armed forces to support the Iraq War. Although initial protests were only directed towards the South Korean government and towards extremists in Iraq, anti-U.S. military protesters decided to seize the moment to trigger a much larger wave of anti-Americanism. During a concert, Psy admonished the Iraqi kidnappers, condemned South Korea's former president Roh Moo-hyun, and also sang along to lyrics of the song "Dear American" by South Korean rock band N.EX.T, which criticizes the United States military for its actions in the Iraq war. An initial translation of the lyrics was posted by an iReporter onto CNN's iReport site. Some of the lyrics, referring to the guards who tortured Iraqi prisoners, were translated by CNN as follows: "Kill those fucking Yankees who have been torturing Iraqi captives and those who ordered them to torture" and "Kill [the Yankees'] daughters, mothers, daughters-in-law and fathers / Kill them all slowly and painfully."

A few days later The Washington Post raised questions about the accuracy of the translation of the lyrics into English, which originated from CNN's citizen journalism initiative iReport. Max Fisher of The Washington Post foreign staff reported that he solicited native Korean and English speakers, academics accustomed to the sensitivity of word-for-word translations, young Koreans familiar with the cultural connotations of the lyrics, and a professional interpreter to offer their translation of the lyrics, and found out that the lyrics may have actually slurred the American servicemen rather than calling for their deaths, although he did also go on to opine that, "using a racial slur to accuse Americans of killing Iraqis' family members is still pretty serious". Fisher also states that the word translated 'Yankee' in the CNN iReport was underplayed, with one Korean American describing the slur as a "nearly untranslatable" racist "epithet," perhaps best approximated as "foreign barbarian." Fisher notes that one translator indicates that the slur is meant as "a derogatory term for American", and that others have translated the slur alternately as "Yankee", "big nose", and "despicable Western women and men".

Although Psy's actions did not receive any significant international media coverage at that time, this changed after the media reported about it in early December 2012. On December 7, 2012, Psy issued an apology directed towards members of the U.S. military and to the American people for his "inflammatory and inappropriate" language, and expressed hope that the American public would accept his apology.

Despite initial public outrage, White House spokesman Josh Earnest told the media that U.S. President Barack Obama and First Lady Michelle Obama will attend Psy's performance at the Christmas in Washington charity concert as planned. As a result of the controversy, a petition circulated on the website of the White House demanding that he be dropped from the concert, although the petition was deleted later in the day because the White House website claimed that the petition violated the website's terms of participation. Time magazine's Nick Carbone asserted that it is "unlikely that these newly dug-up anecdotes will depose Psy from his king-like level of stardom" although Carbone did go on to write that the atmosphere at the White House concert would be "somewhat subdued".

Malaysian political rally
Psy was invited to perform on February 11, 2013, in Penang, Malaysia for the ruling Barisan Nasional party in an attempt to reach out to young voters in the area. Media reports estimated a cost of at least US$300,000 for the performance. Opposition backers called for supporters of the Democratic Action Party to attend wearing opposition colors. Despite the controversy and calls by Malaysian citizens to cancel the concert, Psy completed a Chinese New Year open house performance at Han Chiang School for a crowd of 100,000.

Following the concert, a media report revealed that Psy received death threats prior to entering the country and this was the reason for the delay in Psy's on-stage appearance. Psy eventually performed for ten minutes to an excited crowd. The media report also reported on a press conference at the Jelutong Gerakan Chinese New Year open house that revealed that questions were raised over the financing of the event. State Barisan Nasional (BN) party chief Teng Chang Yeow explained that the event "was sponsored by private sponsors who preferred to remain anonymous as they are afraid of being 'victimised' if their identities were revealed". Teng also stated that he was given the choice of a Justin Bieber visit, but chose Psy as he didn't know who Bieber was at the time.

Questionable song title and revision of lyrics
In March 2013, South Korean media reported that the title of Psy's upcoming single would contain the word "Assarabia", a slang used by South Koreans to express thrills, or simply to describe something satisfying. There were numerous objections to that upcoming title, and worries have risen that people of Arabic descent might misinterpret the title and find it derogatory.

After being questioned by a correspondent of the Voice of America about the upcoming track's potential to offend, Psy said that there has been some misunderstanding and his upcoming song will undergo a major revamp. On March 19, 2013, he revised his song's title and lyrics over "worries it could offend Arabs". Many people consider the change of his song title deliberate, aimed solely at building publicity for a strong follow-up to "Gangnam Style". He subsequently renamed the song "Gentleman" and released it on April 12, 2013.

Reported earnings
According to Korea Times in 2013, Psy earned more than US$40 million in 2012 via sales through concerts, TV commercials, and social media revenue through his hit song Gangnam Style, while his estimated personal income in 2012 was US$28 million under his 7:3 profit-sharing contract with YG Entertainment.

Discography

Psy from the Psycho World! (2001)
Ssa2 (2002)
3 Mai (2002)
Ssajib (2006)
PsyFive (2010)
Chiljip Psy-da (2015)
4X2=8 (2017)
Psy 9th (2022)

Awards and nominations

Filmography

Television

Film

Music video appearances
A list of music videos that feature Psy in a guest or cameo role.

See also
 List of Billboard Social 50 number-one artists

References

External links

 
1977 births
Living people
21st-century South Korean male singers
Anti-consumerists
Articles containing video clips
Avex Group artists
Berklee College of Music alumni
Boston University alumni
English-language singers from South Korea
Grand Prize Golden Disc Award recipients
Grand Prize Seoul Music Award recipients
Korean Music Award winners
Melon Music Award winners
MAMA Award winners
MTV Europe Music Award winners
Rappers from Seoul
Republic Records artists
Schoolboy Records artists
Singers from Seoul
South Korean choreographers
South Korean electronic musicians
South Korean expatriates in the United Kingdom
South Korean expatriates in the United States
South Korean hip hop singers
South Korean male film actors
South Korean male rappers
South Korean pop singers
South Korean record producers
South Korean television personalities
Universal Music Group artists
YG Entertainment artists
South Korean male singer-songwriters
Dance-pop musicians